General elections were held in Barbados on 21 May 2003. The result was a victory for the Barbados Labour Party, which won 23 of the 30 seats. Voter turnout was 57%, the lowest since universal suffrage was introduced in 1951.

Results

References

Barbados
2003 in Barbados
Elections in Barbados
May 2003 events in North America